Torna Hällestad is a locality situated in Lund Municipality, Skåne County, Sweden with 584 inhabitants in 2010.

History
The town church, dating from the 12th century, features mural paintings from the 15th century. Three runestones, dating from the 10th century, were walled into the structure in the 19th century.

References

External links

Populated places in Skåne County
Populated places in Lund Municipality